Ijebu Ode Grammar School (JOGS) is a boys-only secondary school located in Ijebu Ode local government area of Ogun State, South-Western Nigeria. Founded on 20 January 1913, the school is one of the oldest schools in Nigeria.

Houses
Gansallo House
Johnson House 
Kuti House 
Odumosu House
Phillips House 
School House

Notable alumni

Abraham Adesanya, Nigerian lawyer and activist
Inumidun Akande, former Chief Judge of Lagos State
Mobolaji Bank Anthony, former council President of the Lagos Stock Exchange
George Ashiru, Taekwondo grandmaster
Harold Demuren, Nigerian aeronautic engineer 
Bode George, Nigerian Politician and former Military Governor
Seth Kale, former Bishop of Lagos
Adeleke Mamora, current Minister of State for Health
Omololu Meroyi, former senator of Ondo South constituency
Adeola Odutola, Nigerian business mogul
Olu Oyesanya, Nigerian journalist
Vector, rapper and musician
Wizkid, musician

Notable faculty

Israel Oludotun Ransome-Kuti

Old Students Association

Ijebu-Ode Grammar School has an Old Students Association called JOGSOBA (Jebu-Ode Grammar School Old Boys Association)

References

 
Secondary schools in Ogun State
1913 establishments in the Southern Nigeria Protectorate
Educational institutions established in 1913
Boys' schools in Nigeria